Wolf Howard (born 7 April 1968) is an English artist, poet and filmmaker living in Rochester, Kent and was a founder member of the Stuckists art group. He is also a drummer who has played in garage and punk bands, currently as a member of The Musicians of the British Empire (MBE's) with Billy Childish.

Life
Simon 'Wolf' Howard was born in Strood, Kent and attended Mid-Kent College for O-levels, where he "doesn't think he got any but always tells people he got two". In 1986 he began drumming, having taught himself, and has continued to do so ever since. From 1987 for 15 years he was on the dole, except for a total of two periods of two months, one day and half-an-hour, when he was respectively sweeping an ironmonger's warehouse floor, sweeping a neon light warehouse floor, picking apples and working in a frozen shepherds-pie factory. He decided against going to art college on the basis that it would "worsen himself". He lives in Chatham, where he works as a volunteer in an Oxfam shop.

Music

Wolf Howard has played drums in many bands. The most important are (in chronological order) The Daggermen, The James Taylor Quartet, The Prime Movers, The Solarflares, Dodsons Dogs and The Buff Medways. His drumming is "louder than a self-propelled Howitzer."

Art
Howard was one of the 13 original founder members of the Stuckists, a pro-figurative painting, anti-conceptual art group, co-founded by Childish and Charles Thomson in 1999. Howard exhibited in group shows, including The Stuckists Punk Victorian (2004) at the Walker Art Gallery for the Liverpool Biennial and Go West at Spectrum London (2006). He left the group in 2006 to pursue a solo career.

He paints bold figurative images in a simple, vigorous, impasto style. This has incurred criticism for its apparent naivety. Howard has stated that his finished result only comes about after hard work, which can involve scraping the paint back to the canvas up to ten times.

He has explained a particular painting, Mrs Chippy:

In Aesthetica magazine, Abby Jackson contrasted the different
responses of Howard and Luc Tuymans to the subject of 9/11: "Tuymans chooses to avoid his subject matter, whereas Howard, as a Stuckist, approaches his subject head on."

Pinhole photography

Wolf Howard is a member of the Stuckism Photography group and takes pinhole photographs. He uses a light-proof wooden box 4" square with a fixed-size pinhole in the front. Photographic paper is placed at the back of the box. There is no lens and no viewfinder, so he estimates the aim of the camera. A wooden slider allows light into the box for an exposure which is between 40 seconds and 5 minutes. The camera is placed inside a light-proof bag to replace the photographic paper.

He develops a negative print (in his bathroom) and makes the final positive print by placing another sheet of photographic paper under the negative with a 5-second exposure under a light bulb. The whole process requires estimation throughout and he "faces many disappointments in his darkroom. The hard work will eventually pay off."

He describes his motivation:
There is something special about a pinhole camera. There is a beauty in its simplicity and rawness that technology has not been able to better. There is a timeless quality that can make the most uncomplicated subject seem full of poetry.

In each pinhole picture I take I hope to capture the joy and excitement that the early pioneering photographers (Fox Talbot and friends) must have felt when they took and developed photographs for the very first time.

An exhibition of his work, The Pinhole Photographs of a Gifted Gentleman Amateur, was held at the Stuckism International Gallery in 2003 as part of Alternative Arts Photomonth. He was one of the four Stuckist Photographers showing work at the Lady Lever Art Gallery during the 2004 Liverpool Biennial. Jesse Richards wrote in a review of the show, "Wolf Howard's pinhole photographs of a pocket watch, a trench cap, and his friend Billy Childish are beautiful haunting images that seem to be from a world long gone by. I've really never seen anything like it."

Gallery

See also

Stuckism
The Stuckists Punk Victorian
Stuckism Photography
Pinhole Photography

Footnotes

References
Evans, Katherine, ed. (2000), The Stuckists, Victoria Press, 
"Go West", Daily Telegraph. Retrieved 27 August 2007.
Lees, Alasdair (2005). "The Buff Medways, Pleasure Unit, London", The Independent, 5 January 2005. Retrieved 27 August 2007.
Milner, Frank, ed. (2004), The Stuckists Punk Victorian, National Museums Liverpool, . Abbreviated information on Howard from the book is on the Walker Art Gallery web site for painting and photography. Retrieved 27 August 2007.
"Wolf Howard: Pinhole photographs", stuckism.com. Retrieved 21 April 2006

External links
Wolf Howard's Official Site
Wolf Howard's paintings and a poem
Wolf Howard's pinhole photography

Living people
1968 births
20th-century English painters
English male painters
21st-century English painters
Photographers from Kent
Stuckism
People from Strood
English contemporary artists
James Taylor Quartet members
20th-century English male artists
21st-century English male artists